Elisabeth Bürstenbinder  (pen name, Ernst Werner; 25 November 1838, in Berlin – 10 October 1918, in Merano) was a German writer who wrote under the name Ernst Werner. She first gained attention in 1870 with Hermann. Among her works Sacred Vows, Fickle Fortune, Riven Bonds, and some others had English translations.

Bibliography

Novels 
 Am Altar, Leipzig 1873
 Glück auf!, Leipzig 1874
 Gesprengte Fesseln, Leipzig 1875
 Vineta, Leipzig 1877
 Um hohen Preis, Leipzig 1878
 Frühlingsboten, Leipzig 1880
 Der Egoist, Leipzig 1882
 Gebannt und erlöst, Leipzig 1884
 Ein Gottesurteil, Leipzig 1885
 Heimatklang, Leipzig 1887
 Sankt Michael, Leipzig 1887
 Die Alpenfee, Leipzig 1889
 Flammenzeichen, Leipzig 1890
 Freie Bahn!, Leipzig 1893
 Fata Morgana, Leipzig 1896
 Hexengold, Leipzig 1900
 Runen, 1903
 Siegwart, 1909

Novellas 
 Gartenlaubenblüten, Leipzig 1872
 Die Blume des Glücks, Leipzig 1885
 Adlerflug, Berlin 1886

References

External links

German women novelists
German women short story writers
German short story writers
Writers from Berlin
1838 births
1918 deaths
19th-century pseudonymous writers
20th-century pseudonymous writers
Pseudonymous women writers